Vivian Fung (born 1975) is a Canadian-born composer who writes music for orchestras, operas, quartets, and piano. Her compositions have been performed internationally.

Early life and education
Fung was born in Edmonton, Alberta. She began composition studies with Violet Archer and later studied with Narcis Bonet in Paris. She received her doctorate from The Juilliard School in New York City in 2002, where her mentors included David Diamond and Robert Beaser.

Career
Fung's compositions blend Western musical forms with musical ideas from many cultures, including Balinese and Javanese gamelan, and folk songs from minority regions of China. Fung travels often, exploring the diverse cultures of North Vietnam, Spain, and Bali, Indonesia. Her personal heritage has played a strong role in her music. In 2012, Fung traveled to Southwest China for ethno-musicological research to study minority music and cultures in the Yunnan province. It was a continuation of the research that previously inspired "Yunnan Folk Songs" (2011). The project was commissioned by Fulcrum Point New Music in Chicago with support from the MAP Fund.

Fung has received a number of awards and grants, including the 2012 Simon Guggenheim Foundation Fellowship, New York Foundation for the Arts’ Gregory Millard Fellowship, and from ASCAP, BMI, the American Music Center, the MAP Fund, Music Alive!, and the League of American Orchestras, American Composers Forum, and the Canada Council for the Arts. Fung has been the composer-in-residence of the Delaware Chamber Music Festival, the Music in the Loft chamber music series in Chicago, the San Jose Chamber Orchestra, and the Billings Symphony. She also completed residencies at the MacDowell, Yaddo, and Banff arts colonies, as well as residencies at the Atlantic Center for the Arts. She is also an associate composer of the Canadian Music Centre.

Fung's "Violin Concerto" earned her the 2013 Juno Award for Classical Composition of the Year.

After the world premiere in March 2011 of Fung's work "Yunnan Folk Songs", The Chicago Tribune wrote, "'Yunnan Folk Songs' stood out ... [with] a winning rawness that went beyond exoticism."

In 2012, the Naxos Canadian Classics label released the world premiere recording of Fung's "Violin Concerto #1", her "Piano Concerto (Dreamscapes)", and "Glimpses" for prepared piano, with the Metropolis Ensemble conducted by Andrew Cyr, featuring violinist Kristin Lee, and pianist Conor Hanick. Several of her works have also been released commercially on the Telarc, Çedille, and Signpost labels.

Fung's "String Quartet No.3" was commissioned by the 11th Banff International String Quartet Competition (BISQC). It was performed by ten string quartets; the American group, the Dover Quartet, won first prize. The Calgary Herald lauded the piece and referred to it as "Dark Journeys". As music critic Stephan Bonfield pointed out, the work is Fung's emotional response to the world conflict during that year, seen from the point of view of her own family's struggles.

References

External links

1975 births
Living people
21st-century Canadian composers
Musicians from Edmonton
Juilliard School alumni
Juno Award for Classical Composition of the Year winners
21st-century classical composers
Canadian classical composers
Women classical composers
21st-century women composers
Canadian women composers
21st-century Canadian women musicians